Louis-Aimé Maillart (March 24, 1817 – May 26, 1871) was a French composer, best known for his operas, particularly Les Dragons de Villars and Lara.

Biography
Maillart was born in Montpellier (Hérault). He studied at the Conservatoire de Paris from 1833, learning composition from Aimé-Ambroise-Simon Leborne and Fromental Halévy, and violin from Guérin. In 1841 he won France's premier music prize, the Prix de Rome, which brought with it three years' study at the French Academy in Rome. After returning to France he composed his first opera, Gastibelza, ou Le fou de Tolède, which was chosen as the opening work at the Opéra-National (later the Théâtre Lyrique) in 1847. There followed five more operas between then and 1864, all first performed in Paris.

Of his operas, Les dragons de Villars (1856) and Lara (1864) are the best known. Les dragons de Villars premiered at the Théâtre Lyrique; it was also given in Germany under the title Das Glöckchen des Eremiten. Lara was based on a poem of the same name by Lord Byron.

Maiilart died in Moulins, Allier in the Auvergne region of France at the age of 54, and was buried in the Cimetière de Montmartre. Grove's Dictionary of Music and Musicians says of him, "Maillart’s music is characterized by graceful melodies, a colourful, theatrical style and skilful instrumentation".

Operas
Lionel Foscara (cantata) (1841)
Gastilbelza (l'homme à la carbine) (1847)
Le moulin des tilleuls (1849)
Les dragons de Villars (1856)
Les pêcheurs de Catane (1860)
Lara (1864)

References and sources

References

Sources

External links

1817 births
1871 deaths
19th-century classical composers
19th-century French composers
19th-century French male musicians
Burials at Montmartre Cemetery
French classical composers
French male classical composers
French opera composers
Male opera composers
Musicians from Montpellier
Prix de Rome for composition